John Ballantyne  (27 October 1899 – 1977) was a Scottish footballer who played professionally as an inside forward in Scotland, England and the United States.

Born in Glasgow, Ballantyne began his senior career with Partick Thistle in 1921 after time in the junior leagues with Ashfield. In 1924, after signing a new one-season contract with Thistle including a signing bonus, he moved to the United States where he signed with the Boston Soccer Club of the American Soccer League. This nearly led to the suspension of the United States Football Association, an action prevented by stronger agreements between FIFA member associations on player transfer rules.

Ballantyne spent four seasons with Boston before returning to Thistle in 1929. He stayed with the Jags (featuring on the losing side in the replayed 1930 Scottish Cup Final) until 1935 at which point he was briefly loaned to Falkirk, before moving to Queens Park Rangers. He finished his career with the West London club in 1937.

His younger brothers Willie aka 'Red' and Bobby were also footballers who featured for clubs in Scotland and the United States.

References

1899 births
1977 deaths
Date of death missing 
American Soccer League (1921–1933) players
Boston Soccer Club players
Falkirk F.C. players
Ashfield F.C. players
Scottish Junior Football Association players
Partick Thistle F.C. players
Queens Park Rangers F.C. players
Scottish expatriate footballers
Scottish Football League players
Scottish footballers
English Football League players
Scottish Football League representative players
Association football inside forwards
Expatriate soccer players in the United States
Footballers from Glasgow
Scottish expatriate sportspeople in the United States